Cees Heerschop (14 February 1935 – 24 July 2014) was a Dutch professional footballer who played for PSV as a right back, making 191 appearances for the club in all competitions, between 1956 and 1964. He later spent a year with NEC.

References

1935 births
2014 deaths
Dutch footballers
PSV Eindhoven players
NEC Nijmegen players
Eredivisie players
Association football fullbacks
Sportspeople from Hilversum
Footballers from North Holland